Ingvar Yaroslavich (Інгвар Ярославич in Ukrainian), Prince of Dorogobuzh, Prince of Lutsk, Grand Prince of Kiev (Kyiv, 1202 and 1214), Prince of Volodymyr (1207). Son of Yaroslav Izyaslavich, great-grandson of Vladimir Monomakh.

In 1180, Ingvar Yaroslavich joined Ryurik Rostislavich in his struggle against Sviatoslav Vsevolodovich of Chernihiv. According to the Tale of Igor's Campaign, Ingvar was a brave man, however, he never wanted to irritate his powerful neighbors. In 1183, for instance, Ingvar refused to accommodate Vladimir II Yaroslavich in Dorogobuzh, who had been banished from Halych. It appears that Ingvar was wary of Yaroslav Osmomysl, Vladimir Yaroslavich's father. Soon after this, Ingvar took the place of his older brother Vsevolod Yaroslavich as the ruler of Lutsk. In 1202, Ingvar was appointed ruler of Kiev instead of the ousted Ryurik Rostislavich in accordance with a deal between Roman Mstislavich of Halych and Vsevolod the Big Nest, Grand Prince of Vladimir. Ryurik, however, would regain Kiev that same year with the help of the Olgovichs and polovtsy. In 1204, Ingvar took part in capturing the city of Volodymyr together with Alexander of Belz. He was appointed ruler of the city on the spot, but was soon replaced by Alexander due to boyars' discontent. In 1208–1211, Ingvar sent his son to assist Daniil Romanovich in his struggle against the sons of Igor Sviatoslavich of Novhorod-Siverskyi. In 1212, Ingvar and Mstislav Romanovich attacked Vsevolod Sviatoslavich and captured Kiev. After a battle near Belgorod Ingvar voluntarily ceded Kiev to Mstislav Romanovich and left for Lutsk.

Family
 Izyaslav, prince of Dorohobuzh
 Svyatoslav, prince of Shumsk
 Yaroslav, prince of Peremyshl, Shumsk, Lutsk
 Borys
 Grzymisława, wife of Leszek the White

13th-century deaths
Grand Princes of Kiev
Izyaslavichi family (Volhynia)
13th-century princes in Kievan Rus'
Eastern Orthodox monarchs
Year of birth unknown

Year of death unknown